MasterChef Celebrity Argentina is an Argentine gastronomy reality show contest produced by Boxfish TV for Telefe. It is the national variant of the television program and franchise MasterChef in which celebrities from Argentina participate. The program is hosted by Santiago del Moro and the contestants are evaluated by a jury made up of chefs Donato De Santis, Germán Martitegui and Damián Betular.

Format
The tests that the participants will have to face are:

 Mystery box (initial test): the contestants will receive one or more ingredients that they must use in the dish to be cooked in some way, either in their own style or following the instructions or advice given by the jury. The two best dishes will be the captains of the next test. The best applicant will be rewarded in some way, usually with privileges such as not being expelled from that program or some advantage for subsequent tests.
 Creative challenge (initial test): the applicants will be limited to using a few ingredients, and with them they must cook the dish they decide on, trying to ensure that the proposed ingredients combine properly.
 Pressure test (initial test): the toughest test. An important star of the kitchen will visit the program, will show them one of his creations and they will have to reproduce it as faithfully as possible following the instructions and steps of the master.
 Team test: the contestants are divided into two teams, red and blue, choosing the captain of each of the members and the menu to cook among several exposed, starting the best of the initial test. The contestants must cook in an organized way to get all the dishes out on time.
 Elimination test: the team or contestants that have done the best in the previous test will be exempt from this test. The rest must cook the recipe indicated by the jury. They will "deliberate" and whoever has made the "worst" dish will leave the program.

Only one of the three initial test variations is performed in each program. All tests have a time limit established by the jury, and before starting the applicants have three minutes to stock up on ingredients from the "supermarket", except in the team test.

First season (2020) 
In mid-2020, Telefe confirmed that an edition of MasterChef Argentina would be held with characters known to the public; It was also announced that Santiago del Moro would be in charge of driving and that the influencer Flor Vigna would be in charge of presenting exclusive content for social networks. The chef Christophe Krywonis announced that he would not be part of the jury for this edition and that his place will be taken by Damián Betular, joining Donato De Santis and Germán Martitegui.

On September 26, it was confirmed that the reality show would air from October 5, from Monday to Thursday at 10:30 p.m. (GMT-3) and eliminations would be hold on Sundays at the same time. During the afternoon of Friday, October 2, it was confirmed that the entertainment journalist, Marcelo Polino, would be in charge of commenting on the culinary reality show on the programs of Florencia Peña, Flor de Equipo, in the morning, on Verónica Lozano, Cortá por Lozano, in the afternoon and at Gerardo Rozín and Jésica Cirio, La Peña de Morfi on Sunday afternoons prior to the Elimination Gala.

On October 12, 2020, it was confirmed that "Polaco" Cwirkaluk had tested positive for coronavirus, being confirmed on October 18 that he would be replaced by actress Natalie Pérez until he is recovered. Soon after, the positive of the vedete Victoria Xipolitakis was added, who is replaced by the model Christian Sancho. On October 20, it came to light that the jury Germán Martitegui had also tested positive for coronavirus, being replaced by Dolli Irigoyen.

On Monday, January 18, Claudia Villafañe was crowned the winner of this first season after beating Analía Franchín in the final.

Contestants

Second season (2021) 
On November 3, 2020, after the resounding success in terms of audience of the first season, Telefe renewed the program for a second season to premiere on February 22, 2021. On December 2, 2020, it was confirmed to the first participant of this edition, the actress Carmen Barbieri. On February 3, Claudia Fontán was announced as a new participant to join from the second week of the competition. Filming began on January 25, and the show debuted on February 22.

Contestants

Third season (2021/2022)
After the broadcast of the second season and after repeating the success of the previous season, Telefe renewed the program for a third season to premiere in November 2021. During the month of October, the journalist and ambassador of the reality Marcelo Polino was revealing and confirming, in the Flor de equipo program, the 16 official participants of the third edition of the cooking competition. That same month, the channel already began to promote the season with advertisements showing the contestants. Recordings began on October 19. More demanding and new challenges waited actress Catherine Fulop, actor Gastón Soffritti, sports journalist Tití Fernández, police journalist Paulo Kablan, host Denise Dumas, actress Luisa Albinoni, musician Joaquín Levinton, and former judoka and now traumatologist Paula Peque Pareto, model and hostess Mery del Cerro, influencer Vicky Braier "Juariu", socialite Charlotte Caniggia, former soccer player Héctor Adolfo El Negro Enrique, boxer Marcela Tigresa Acuña and actors José Luis Gioia and Tomás Fonzi.

They had to go through a different challenge every day, withstand the pressure of time and the demands of the judges to demonstrate their skills and thus remain in the contest and become the great champion. Whoever succeeds will win 1,500,000 pesos and other important prizes.

The third season took place in a new, larger studio with state-of-the-art technology. The most famous kitchens in the country were renovated for the contestants to face original challenges. The tests surprised for their originality and, as in each edition, there were great guest stars for the special challenges.

Contestants

References

External links

Cooking competitions
Argentine cuisine